Paris Jazz Piano is a studio album by jazz pianist Michel Legrand, released in 1960 on Philips Records.

Track listing
"Sous les ponts de Paris" (Jean Rodor, Scotto) - 2:55
"Paris in the Spring" (Revel, Gordon) - 3:32
"April in Paris" (Harburg, Duke) - 5:14
"Sous le ciel de Paris" (Hubert Giraud, Jean Dréjac) - 1:52
"Paris Canaille" (Ferré) - 2:04
"Paris, je t'aime... d'amour" (Clifford Grey, Henri Battaille, Victor Schertzinger) - 4:24
"I Love Paris" (Porter) - 2:52
"The Last Time I Saw Paris" (Kern, Hammerstein II) - 2:25
"Moulin Rouge" (Auric, Engvick) - 2:41
"La Vie en rose" (Piaf, Louiguy) - 3:08

Recorded on October 20 (5, 7, 10), October 21 (1, 9), October 23 (8) and November 9 (2, 3, 6), 1959.

Personnel
Michel Legrand - piano
Guy Pedersen - bass
Gus Wallez - drums, bongos

References

1960 albums
Philips Records albums